Cyperus mudugensis is a species of sedge that is native to central and eastern parts of Somalia.

See also 
 List of Cyperus species

References 

mudugensis
Plants described in 1994
Flora of Somalia